Al-Jazira Mohammed bin Zayed Stadium is a multi-purpose stadium in Abu Dhabi, United Arab Emirates. It is currently used mostly for football and cricket matches and is the home ground of Al Jazira Club. It is named after Mohammed bin Zayed Al Nahyan.

Capacity change
The stadium's original capacity was 15,000 but it was expanded. Half of the project was completed by December 2006 and the stadium hosted the 18th Arabian Gulf Cup the next month. The UAE won the tournament in the stadium which held 24,000 spectators. The stadium was expanded again for the 2019 AFC Asian Cup.

Trivia
 Hosted 3 List A matches in 1999 between the A teams of India, Pakistan and Sri Lanka.
 Hosted 8 matches of the 2003 FIFA World Youth Championship.
 Hosted 3 matches of the 2009 and 2010 FIFA Club World Cups, along with the Zayed Sports City Stadium.

2019 AFC Asian Cup
The Mohammed bin Zayed Stadium hosted seven games of the 2019 AFC Asian Cup, including a round of 16 match, a quarter-final match and a semi-final match.

In the semi-final match between Qatar and hosts the United Arab Emirates, the UAE supporters threw bottles and footwear onto the pitch. This conduct was preceded by booing the Qatari national anthem. Qatar won 4–0 despite the situation, reaching their first Asian Cup final.

References

External links

Official Site – Al Jazira Club
Image of the Stadium
AFL Architects

Al Jazira Club
Football venues in the United Arab Emirates
Football venues in Abu Dhabi
Sports venues in Abu Dhabi
Multi-purpose stadiums in the United Arab Emirates
Sports venues completed in 1979
1979 establishments in the United Arab Emirates